Take Your Son, Sir! (1851–56) is an unfinished painting by Ford Madox Brown which depicts a woman showing her newborn son to its father. She is offering her baby towards the viewer of the painting, who is implicitly equated with the father - seen in the mirror behind, opening his arms to receive the baby. The mirror also forms a halo behind the mother's head, and the pattern on the wallpaper suggests the starry heavens. Brown's principal influence was Jan van Eyck's painting the Arnolfini Marriage Portrait, recently acquired by the National Gallery. The mirror resembles the circular mirror in van Eyck's painting, which reflects an image of the artist looking at the couple in the image.

The woman is wearing crinolines, which expand to cover the whole of the lower part of the painting. Brown has left this part incomplete, roughly squaring up and sketching the dress in outline. The title is written on the unfinished dress, underneath the child at the right.

Brown's own wife was pregnant whilst he was painting this picture and she gave birth to a son which they named Arthur.   Arthur then died at just ten months old  and it is considered Brown was unable to complete the painting through grief for his son, so he abandoned it.

Interpretations

There are two principal interpretations of the picture. Most critics see it as an image of a wife offering the child to her husband, an interpretation supported by the sacred symbolism and by the fact that Brown depicted his own wife and their new son. Some commentators, however, interpret it as more confrontational image, in which an abandoned mistress presents her baby to its father.

The art historian Marcia Pointon has argued that the painting is deliberately paradoxical, playing on the conflict between new life and death. She suggests that the portrayal of the baby is influenced by medical images of fetuses surrounded by viscera within the body of woman, and that the woman's glazed, white and emaciated features suggest death.

Notes

1856 paintings
Unfinished paintings
Paintings by Ford Madox Brown
Paintings of children
Paintings of women